The  is an infantry regiment of the Japan Ground Self-Defense Force, being stationed at Camp Utsunomiya near the Utsunomiya Air Field (Camp Kita-Utsunomiya), as it is intended to be ready for rapid deployment both in Japan and abroad.

History 
The regiment was established in August 2006. The first regimental commander, Colonel Yamamoto, was appointed in 2007 with the formation of the regiment was complete by March 2008.

In 2009, a detachment selected from the regiment was sent to Djibouti to participate in an anti-piracy operation as a security force at the air base. Since then, the regiment has been deployed on a number of missions outside of Japan, including a humanitarian assistance mission for the 2010 Haiti earthquake and the United Nations Mission in South Sudan.

Organization and Equipment 
The regiment was established as a unique infantry regiment of the Central Readiness Force. Unlike the 1st Airborne Brigade being a unique airborne force, the regiment has adopted a table of organization and equipment similar to that of an infantry regiment with three rifle companies. However, it has developed specialized organization of its own for special missions, including a military engineering company being established in 2017 and an explosive ordnance disposal team in 2019. All of the soldiers in this regiment have volunteered to be transferred, and many are qualified as paratrooper or ranger.

The regiment is equipped with armoured fighting vehicles similar to other infantry regiments, including Komatsu LAV and Type 96 Armored Personnel Carrier. In addition, the regiment also is equipped with unique equipment to prepare for military operations other than war overseas, such as Bushmaster Protected Mobility Vehicles for non-combatant evacuation operations and Long-range acoustic devices as non-lethal weapons.

In August 25, 2019, an IHI Aerospace-made unmanned ground vehicle was deployed at the 2019 Fuji Firepower demonstration for explosive ordnance disposal missions.

References

Books

External links

 Central Readiness Regiment Official Webpage 

Infantry regiments
Military units and formations established in 2008
2008 establishments in Japan